The 1983–84 Fulham RLFC season was the fourth in the club's history. They competed in the 1983–84 Championship in the Rugby Football League. They also competed in the 1983–84 Challenge Cup and the 1983–84 League Cup. They finished the season in 13th place and were relegated from the top tier of professional rugby league in the UK.

1983-84 squad

Championship
Final Standings

References

External links

London Broncos seasons
London Broncos season
1983 in rugby league by club
1983 in English rugby league
London Broncos season
1984 in rugby league by club
1984 in English rugby league